Lars Petter Nordhaug (born 14 May 1984) is a Norwegian former road bicycle racer, who competed professionally between 2005 and 2017 for the , ,  and  teams.

Career

Early career
Nordhaug started his career as a mountain biker, but after finishing 5th in the 2004 Norwegian National Road Race Championships, his focus changed towards road bicycle racing. His breakthrough came two years later, in 2006, when he won the national road race championships. This year was his breakout year, also winning Birkebeinerrittet, a Norwegian long-distance mountain-bike cycling race.

In August 2009, Nordhaug scored a second overall finish on the Tour of Ireland while riding for UCI Continental team . This race was a three-stage event classified as 2.1. His victory in the undulating last stage carried him to that placing, after he got the best of breakaway companion Russell Downing, who won the general classification.

Team Sky (2010–12)
After a week of rumours, it was announced on 10 September 2009 that Nordhaug would be joining  from the 2010 season, along with fellow Norwegians Edvald Boasson Hagen and Kurt Asle Arvesen. Nordhaug spent the 2010 and 2011 seasons working mainly as a domestique, riding the Ardennes classics and the 2011 Giro d'Italia. He signed a new contract with Sky at the end of 2011.

Nordhaug took his first victory for Sky at the 2012 Trofeo Deià, the third race at the Vuelta a Mallorca. He shook off the last contenders on the last difficulty of the day, before descending solo and crossing the line in Deià, registering his first victory since 2009. He also rode a good Critérium International event in Corsica, finishing fourth overall behind a strong podium composed of Cadel Evans, Pierrick Fédrigo and his teammate Michael Rogers. Nordhaug led Sky at the Tour of the Basque Country, where he came sixth overall. His promising early season form saw him take a prominent role in the team's Ardennes classics squad. Nordhaug was well placed in the closing stages of the Amstel Gold Race but crashed out in the final  of the finishing climb, the Cauberg, after clashing wheels with 's Damiano Cunego. Nordhaug was not selected for the Vuelta a España and instead rode the Danmark Rundt, where he won the third stage, to take the overall lead in the race. He took his biggest career victory to that point at the 2012 Grand Prix Cycliste de Montréal, winning a sprint from a group of four riders after his solo attack was caught in the closing stages of the race.

Belkin (2013–14)
In August 2012, Nordhaug announced that he would leave  at the end of the 2012 season, and would join  on a two-year contract from the 2013 season onwards.

Return to Sky (2015–16)

At the 2014 UCI Road World Championships, Nordhaug confirmed that he would be leaving . Team Sky later announced that he would be rejoining the team from 1 January 2015.

He made history at the 2015 Tour de Yorkshire, winning the inaugural stage of the new race from a breakaway of five riders. With that move, he took the leader's jersey and the points jersey, neither of which he would relinquish, to become the first winner of the race. This was also the first stage race won by Nordhaug outside his native Norway.

Major results

2001
 2nd  Cross-country, UCI World Junior MTB Championships
2004
 1st  Cross-country, National MTB Championships
2005
 1st  Road race, National Under-23 Road Championships
 5th Overall Ringerike GP
2006
 1st  Road race, National Road Championships
 1st Birkebeinerrittet
2007
 1st Gjøvik GP
 4th Overall Ringerike GP
 5th Overall Paris–Corrèze
2008
 1st  Cross-country, National MTB Championships
 1st  Overall Festningsrittet
1st  Points classification
1st Stages 2 & 3
 2nd Overall GP Borremans Viane
 3rd Road race, National Road Championships
 3rd Overall Kalas Cup Trophy
 7th Overall Tour of Ireland
 7th Sparkassen Giro Bochum
 8th Overall Rhône-Alpes Isère Tour
1st  Mountains classification
 9th Overall Ringerike GP
2009
 2nd Overall Tour of Ireland
1st Stage 3
 4th Overall Tour de Normandie
1st Stage 5
 5th Overall Ringerike GP
2010
 1st Stage 1 (TTT) Tour of Qatar
 9th Oslo Grand Prix
2011
 1st Tønsberg Cyclo-cross
 6th Coppa Sabatini
2012
 1st Grand Prix Cycliste de Montréal
 1st Trofeo Deià
 National Road Championships
2nd Road race
3rd Time trial
 3rd Overall Tour of Norway
 4th Overall Critérium International
 6th Overall Tour of the Basque Country
 10th Overall Danmark Rundt
1st Stage 3
2013
 1st  National CX Championships
 1st  Mountains classification, Arctic Race of Norway
 2nd Overall Tour des Fjords
 8th Grand Prix Cycliste de Montréal
2014
 3rd Overall Arctic Race of Norway
1st Stage 1
2015
 1st  Overall Tour de Yorkshire
1st  Points classification
1st Stage 1
 10th Overall Tour of Norway
2016
 6th Overall Tour de Yorkshire
 9th Strade Bianche

References

External links

1984 births
Living people
Norwegian male cyclists
Olympic cyclists of Norway
Cyclists at the 2008 Summer Olympics
Cyclists at the 2012 Summer Olympics
Cyclists at the 2016 Summer Olympics
Cross-country mountain bikers
Sportspeople from Tønsberg
Norwegian mountain bikers